Martin Müller (born 25 July 1966) is a Swiss former wrestler who competed in the 1992 Summer Olympics and in the 1996 Summer Olympics.

References

External links
 

1966 births
Living people
Olympic wrestlers of Switzerland
Wrestlers at the 1992 Summer Olympics
Wrestlers at the 1996 Summer Olympics
Swiss male sport wrestlers
20th-century Swiss people